In probability theory, a pairwise independent collection of random variables is a set of random variables any two of which are independent.  Any collection of mutually independent random variables is pairwise independent, but some pairwise independent collections are not mutually independent.  Pairwise independent random variables with finite variance are uncorrelated.

A pair of random variables X and Y are independent if and only if the random vector (X, Y) with joint cumulative distribution function (CDF)  satisfies

or equivalently, their joint density  satisfies

That is, the joint distribution is equal to the product of the marginal distributions.

Unless it is not clear in context, in practice the modifier "mutual" is usually dropped so that independence means mutual independence. A statement such as " X, Y, Z are independent random variables" means that X, Y, Z are mutually independent.

Example

Pairwise independence does not imply mutual independence, as shown by the following example attributed to S. Bernstein.

Suppose X and Y are two independent tosses of a fair coin, where we designate 1 for heads and 0 for tails. Let the third random variable Z be equal to 1 if exactly one of those coin tosses resulted in "heads", and 0 otherwise (i.e.). Then jointly the triple (X, Y, Z) has the following probability distribution:

Here the marginal probability distributions are identical:  and
 The bivariate distributions also agree:  where 

Since each of the pairwise joint distributions equals the product of their respective marginal distributions, the variables are pairwise independent:

 X and Y are independent, and
 X and Z are independent, and
 Y and Z are independent.

However, X, Y, and Z are not mutually independent, since  the left side equalling for example 1/4 for (x, y, z) = (0, 0, 0) while the right side equals 1/8 for (x, y, z) = (0, 0, 0). That is as far from independence as random variables can get.

Probability of the union of pairwise independent events 
Bounds on the probability that the sum of Bernoulli random variables is at least one, commonly known as the union bound, are provided by the Boole–Fréchet inequalities. While these bounds assume only univariate information, several bounds with knowledge of general bivariate probabilities, have been proposed too. Denote by  a set of    Bernoulli events with probability of occurrence   for each . Kounias  derived the following upper bound:
 
which subtracts the maximum weight of a star spanning tree on a complete graph with  nodes (where the edge weights are given by ) from the sum of the marginal probabilities . 

where  is the set of all spanning trees on the graph. These bounds are not the tightest possible with general bivariates  even when feasibility is guaranteed as shown in Boros et.al. However, when the variables are pairwise independent, Ramachandra-Natarajan  showed that the Kounias-Hunter-Worsley  bound is tight by proving that the maximum probability of the union of events admits a closed-form expression given as:

It is interesting to note that the tight bound in  depends only on the sum of the smallest  probabilities  and the largest probability . Thus, while ordering of the probabilities plays a role in the derivation of the bound, the ordering among the smallest  probabilities  is inconsequential since only their sum is used.

Comparison with the Boole–Fréchet union bound
It is useful to compare the smallest bounds on the probability of the union with arbitrary dependence and pairwise independence respectively. The tightest Boole–Fréchet upper union bound (assuming only univariate information) is given as:

,  

Generalization

More generally, we can talk about k-wise independence, for any k ≥ 2. The idea is similar: a set of random variables is k-wise independent if every subset of size k of those variables is independent. k-wise independence has been used in theoretical computer science, where it was used to prove a theorem about the problem MAXEkSAT.

k-wise independence is used in the proof that k-independent hashing functions are secure unforgeable message authentication codes.

See also 

 Pairwise
 Pairwise disjoint

References 

Theory of probability distributions
Independence (probability theory)